Atide is an opera in three acts by Josef Mysliveček set to a libretto by Tomaso Stanzani that is based on Greek legends about Atys, an ancient king of Lydia. Stanzani's libretto is based on an earlier libretto by Philippe Quinault that was originally set by Jean-Baptiste Lully as Atys in 1676.  The opera Atide (and all the rest of Mysliveček's operas) belong to the serious type in Italian language referred to as opera seria.

Performance history

The opera was first performed at the Teatro Nuovo in Padua in June 1774, probably on 13 June, the Feast of St. Anthony of Padua. It constitutes the last record of the composer's association with the city of Padua, an association that produced three oratorios and a brilliant series of violin concertos.  The composer's intense period of activity as an opera composer during the year 1774 is reflected in his use of a pre-existent overture and several pre-existent arias to fill out Atide.  For an operatic center as provincial as Padua, he seems not to have wanted to take greater care.  The cast was one of the least distinguished (and smallest) that he composed for after he established his reputation in Naples in 1767 with Il Bellerofonte.  There is no information available about the reception of his opera in Padua.

Roles

Vocal set pieces

Act I, scene 1 - Aria of Atide, "Sazio di stragi e morte" 
Act I, scene 2 - Aria of Adrasto, "Se incerta ti lascio" 
Act I, scene 5 - Aria of Esione, "Alma grande, alma regale" 
Act I, scene 6 - Aria of Erissena, "Lasciami adesso in pace" 
Act I, scene 9 - Aria of Licastro, "Chi d'un l'eterno affetto" 
Act I, scene 11 - Accompanied recitative for Adrasto, "Ah, chi provò del mio più acerbo affanno" 
Act I, scene 11 - Aria of Adrasto, "Affanni di quest'alma"

Act II, scene 1 - Aria of Atide, "Da quei vezzosa" 
Act II, scene 2 - Aria of Erissena, "Sento nell'alma mia" 
Act II, scene 3 - Aria of Licastro, "Prence, che affanno" 
Act II, scene 4 - Aria of Adrasto, "Serbo infelice in seno" 
Act II, scene 5 - Aria of Esione, "Quel traditore intendo" 
Act II, scene 8 - Aria of Licastro, "Figlia, ti lascio" 
Act II, scene 9 - Duet of Erissena and Adrasto, "Ah che nel dirti addio"

Act III, scene 3 - Aria of Adrasto, "Amo si dolce oggetto"
Act III, scene 4 - Accompanied recitative of Erissena, "Ecco mi giunta al fine" 
Act III, scene 4 - Aria of Erissena, "Vado crudel tiranno" 
Act III, scene 5 - Chorus, "Cessi l'antico sdegno"

References
Freeman, Daniel E.  Josef Mysliveček, "Il Boemo."  Sterling Heights, Mich.: Harmonie Park Press, 2009.

Italian-language operas
Operas by Josef Mysliveček
1774 operas
Opera seria
Operas
Operas based on classical mythology